Gymnastics is an event at the Island Games, the biennial multi-sports event for island nations, territories and dependencies.

Gymnastics at the Island Games began in 1989 with Men joining the event from 1991.

Women's competitions
 Competition 1. Team Floor and Vault and Overall Team Floor and Vault. 5 competitors per Team. Best 4 scores to count.
 Competition 2. Individual and Overall apparatus. Maximum of 6 competitors per Member Island.
 Competition 3. Individual Set 4 piece Maximum of 6 competitors per Member Island.

Men's competitions
 Competition 1. Team Floor and Vault and Overall Team Floor and Vault 4 competitors per Team. Best 3 scores to count. 
 Competition 2. Individual and Overall apparatus. Maximum of 6 competitors per Member Island. 
 Competition 3. Individual Set 6 piece. Maximum of 6 competitors per Member Island.

Minimum age - 13

Events
As of 2017, (gymnastics wasn't held in 1999, 2011 and 2019).

Top Medalists

Men's

Men's Compulsory

Men's Floor & Vault

Men's Floor & Vault Team Event

Men's Individual Apparatus

Men's Tumbling

Women's

Women's Compulsory

Women's Floor & Vault

Women's Floor & Vault Team Event

Women's Individual Apparatus

Women's Tumbling

References

 
Sports at the Island Games
Island Games